The Girl and the Spider is a Swiss drama film, directed by Ramon Zürcher and Silvan Zürcher and released in 2021. The film centres on Mara (Henriette Confurius) and Lisa (Liliane Amuat), two women who have been living together, and portrays the emotional complications as Lisa moves out to a new apartment. 

The cast also includes Ursina Lardi, Flurin Giger, André Hennicke, Ivan Georgiev, Dagna Litzenberger-Vinet, Lea Draeger, Sabine Timoteo and Birte Schnöink.

The film premiered in the Encounters program at the 2021 Berlin Film Festival, where the Zürchers won the award for Best Director in the program alongside Denis Côté for Social Hygiene (Hygiène sociale). It had its North American premiere at the 2021 Toronto International Film Festival.

References

External links

2021 films
2021 drama films
2021 LGBT-related films
Swiss drama films
Swiss LGBT-related films
LGBT-related drama films
Lesbian-related films
2020s German-language films